Frederick Oliver Mason (1 August 1901 – after 1930) was an English footballer born in Solihull, now in the West Midlands. He played as a full back in the Football League for Cardiff City, Rochdale and Merthyr Town, and then moved to Ireland where he played for Dundalk and Derry City.

References

1901 births
Year of death missing
Sportspeople from Solihull
English footballers
Association football fullbacks
Cardiff City F.C. players
Rochdale A.F.C. players
Merthyr Town F.C. players
Dundalk F.C. players
Derry City F.C. players
English Football League players
League of Ireland players